The Iberville Parish Courthouse is a historic building located at 57735 Main Street in Plaquemine, Louisiana.

Built in 1848 by George and Thomas Weldon, of Natchez, it served as a courthouse until 1906. It served as Plaquemine City Hall from 1906 until 1985, and was and later restored for its present use as Iberville Museum.

It is a stuccoed brick building in Greek Revival architecture that is five bays wide with a central, pedimented portico of four Doric columns.

The building was added to the National Register of Historic Places on May 31, 1980.

See also
National Register of Historic Places listings in Iberville Parish, Louisiana

References

External links
Iberville Museum website

Museums in Iberville Parish, Louisiana
Courthouses on the National Register of Historic Places in Louisiana
Greek Revival architecture in Louisiana
Government buildings completed in 1848
Buildings and structures in Iberville Parish, Louisiana
Parish courthouses in Louisiana
National Register of Historic Places in Iberville Parish, Louisiana
1848 establishments in Louisiana